Ernest Torrence (born Ernest Torrance-Thomson, 26 June 1878 – 15 May 1933) was a Scottish film character actor who appeared in many Hollywood films, including Broken Chains (1922) with Colleen Moore, Mantrap (1926) with Clara Bow and Fighting Caravans (1931) with Gary Cooper and Lili Damita. A towering (6' 4") figure, Torrence frequently played cold-eyed and imposing villains.

Biography

Education and early work
He was born to Colonel Henry Torrence Thayson and Jessie (née Bryce) on 26 June 1878, in Edinburgh, Scotland, and as a child was an exceptional pianist and operatic baritone and graduated from the Stuttgart Conservatory, Edinburgh Academy before earning a scholarship at London's Royal Academy of Music. He toured with the D'Oyly Carte Opera Company in such productions as The Emerald Isle (1901), Little Hans Andersen (1903) and The Talk of the Town (1905) before disarming vocal problems set in and he was forced to abandon this career path.

Sometime prior to 1900, he changed the spelling of Torrance to Torrence and dropped the name Thomson. Both Ernest and his actor brother David Torrence went to America, with Ernest joining David in New York in September 1911. Focusing on a purely acting career, Ernest and his brother developed into experienced players on the Broadway New York stage. Ernest received significant acclaim with Modest Suzanne in 1912, and a prominent role in The Night Boat in 1920 brought him to the attention of the early Hollywood filmmakers.

Film career
Torrence played the despicable adversary Luke Hatburn in Tol'able David (1921) opposite Richard Barthelmess and immediately settled into films for the rest of his career and life. He played an old codger in the acclaimed classic western The Covered Wagon (1923) and gained attention from his roles in The Hunchback of Notre Dame (1923) as Clopin, king of the beggars, and with Betty Bronson in Peter Pan (1924) as the dastardly Captain Hook. He played an Army General who escapes into the circus world and becomes a clown in The Side Show of Life (1924).

In an offbeat bit of casting he paired up with Clara Bow in Mantrap (1926), unusually as a gentle, giant type backwoodsman in search of a wife. He appeared in other silent film classics such as The King of Kings (1927) (as Peter) and Steamboat Bill, Jr. (1928) as Buster Keaton's steamboat captain father. During the course of his twelve-year film career, Ernest made 49 films, both silent and "talkies".

Death
Torrence made the transition into talking films very well, starring in Fighting Caravans (1931) with Gary Cooper and Lili Damita. He was able to play a notable nemesis, Dr. Moriarty, to Clive Brook's Sherlock in Sherlock Holmes (1932) in one of his last roles.

Filming for I Cover the Waterfront (1933), in which he starred as a smuggler opposite Claudette Colbert in New York City, had just been completed when he died suddenly on 15 May 1933. While en route to Europe by ship, Torrence suffered an acute attack of gall stones and was rushed back to a New York City hospital. He died of complications following surgery.

Partial filmography

A Dangerous Affair (1919) - Abner
Tol'able David (1921) - Luke Hatburn
 The Prodigal Judge (1922) - Solomon Mahaffy
Singed Wings (1922) - Emilio
Broken Chains (1922) - Boyan Boone
The Kingdom Within (1922) - Krieg
The Covered Wagon (1923) - William Jackson
The Trail of the Lonesome Pine (1923) - 'Devil' Jud Tolliver
The Brass Bottle (1923) - Fakresh-el-Aamash
The Hunchback of Notre Dame (1923) - Clopin
Ruggles of Red Gap (1923) - Cousin Egbert Floud
West of the Water Tower (1923) - Rev. Adrian Plummer
Heritage of the Desert (1924) - August Naab
The Fighting Coward (1924) - Gen. Orlando Jackson
The Side Show of Life (1924) - Andrew Lackaday
North of 36 (1924) - Jim Nabours
Peter Pan (1924) - Captain James Hook
The Dressmaker from Paris (1925) - Angus McGregor
The Wanderer (1925) - Tola
Night Life of New York (1925) - John Bentley
The Pony Express (1925) - 'Ascension' Jones
The American Venus (1926) - King Neptune
The Blind Goddess (1926) - Mr. Clayton
The Rainmaker (1926) - Mike
Mantrap (1926) - Joe Easter
The Lady of the Harem (1926) - Hassan
The King of Kings (1927) - Peter
Captain Salvation (1927) - Captain of the 'Panther'
Twelve Miles Out (1927) - Red McCue
Across to Singapore (1928) - Capt. Mark Shore
Steamboat Bill, Jr. (1928) - William "Steamboat Bill" Canfield Sr.
The Cossacks (1928) - Ivan
Desert Nights (1929) - Lord Stonehill
The Bridge of San Luis Rey (1929) - Uncle Pio
Speedway (1929) - Jim MacDonald
The Unholy Night (1929) - Dr. Ballou
Untamed (1929) - Ben Murchison
Officer O'Brien (1930) - John P. O'Brien
Strictly Unconventional (1930) - Lord Porteous
Sweet Kitty Bellairs (1930) - Sir Jasper Standish
Call of the Flesh (1930) - Esteban
Fighting Caravans (1931) - Bill Jackson
Shipmates (1931) - Scotty
The Great Lover (1931) - Potter
Sporting Blood (1931) - Mr. Jim Rellence
New Adventures of Get Rich Quick Wallingford (1931) - Blackie Daw
The Cuban Love Song (1931) - Romance
Sherlock Holmes (1932) - Professor James Moriarty
Hypnotized (1932) - Prof. Horace S. Limberly - Hypnotist
I Cover the Waterfront (1933) - Eli Kirk (final film role)

References

External links

Photographs and literature on Ernest Torrence

1878 births
1933 deaths
20th-century Scottish male opera singers
20th-century Scottish male actors
Burials at Forest Lawn Memorial Park (Glendale)
Deaths from digestive disease
Scottish male film actors
Scottish male silent film actors
Scottish operatic baritones
Scottish pianists
State University of Music and Performing Arts Stuttgart alumni
British expatriate male actors in the United States